Alagwa is a 2012 Filipino drama horror film written and directed by Ian Loreños. The film stars Jericho Rosales, a father struggling to search his son after disappearing in the city. The film is inspired by a popular urban legend about a child's disappearance in Chinatown Manila. The film uncovers the dark facets of the underground business of human trafficking in the Philippines.

The film had its world premiere at the 17th Busan International Film Festival in 2012, and have its limited screening in the Philippines during the CinemaOne Originals Film Festival 2012, last December. The film was released commercially by Star Cinema this October 9, 2013.

Synopsis
An impoverished single parent, Robert Lim (Jericho Rosales) spends his free time with his young son Brian (Bugoy Cariño) after  the death of his wife during childbirth. As a child, Brian is stubborn and often get into fight with his schoolmates, teasing him about how his father looks like a hobo. After a sales presentation in one of Robert's clients who tried to make advances sexually, Brian got into a fight with his classmate, almost stabbing his classmate's eye. After the meeting with his client, Robert picks Brian but instead got called in the Principal's Office. After explaining the incident to him, Robert asked for forgiveness with Brian's behavior and asked to leave. In their home, Robert disciplines his son. Robert tried to make up by going to the mall.

Robert goes to a mall with Brian for some father and son bonding time. Brian goes to the bathroom and then mysteriously disappears. Robert, worried about his son's disappearance, informs the police chief (Leo Martinez) that his son is abducted.

Evidence from a surveillance camera disc shows a teenage kid talking to his son. Enraged by this, Robert goes to a park in Quezon Avenue in search of the suspect and later witnesses him getting out off a taxi. Robert chases after him but the kid escapes. The next day, the police recover the body of a dead boy, Robert first thinks it is his son but it turns out to be the body of his son's kidnapper.

Robert, becoming more furious, attempts to hunt down the man responsible for his son's disappearance. He encounters a vigilante who, with his knowledge about the suspects of Brian's kidnapping, tells him that Brian's kidnapping is the result of human-trafficking and that his son is now being transported to Hong Kong. That night, Robert receives a call from the vigilante, telling him to meet him under an overpass but they get ambushed by the police and the vigilante dies on the scene.

Several years later, Robert has a new family and with his new son (John Manalo) he travels to Hong Kong. On the streets, his son suddenly goes missing and Robert goes to search for him, feeling worried that the previous incident would also happen to his new family. While searching in a subway Robert finds a homeless man playing a harmonica. He recognises the homeless man's harmonica, realising that Brian had exactly the same harmonica from his childhood. Robert also remembers Brian teaching him a secret handshake and when he attempts the secret handshake with the homeless man he gets the same handshake in return. Realising that his long-lost son is finally found, Robert tearfully embraces him and the story concludes with his other son witnessing the scene.

Cast
Jericho Rosales as Robert Lim
Bugoy Cariño as Bryan Lim
John Manalo as the other son of Robert from his new family
Leo Martinez
Carmen Soo
Smokey Manaloto

Awards and nominations
2013 FAMAS Awards
 Nominated-Best Actor – Jericho Rosales
 Nominated-Best Child Actor – Bugoy Cariño
2013 Gawad Urian Awards
 Winner-Best Actor – Jericho Rosales
 Nominated-Best Director – Ian Loreños
 Nominated-Best Editing – Dempster Samarista
 Nominated-Best Screenplay – Ian Loreños
2013 Golden Screen Awards
 Nominated-Best Film (Drama)
 Nominated-Best Actor – Jericho Rosales
 Nominated-Best Story – Ian Loreños
2013 Newport Beach Film Festival
 Winner-Outstanding Achievement in Acting - Jericho Rosales
ASEAN Film Festival
 Winner-Best Supporting Actor - Bugoy Cariño

References

External links
 

Philippine horror films
2012 films
Star Cinema films
Films directed by Ian Loreños